The Ministry of Foreign Affairs (Syrtqy ıster ministrlıgı) is the Kazakh government ministry which oversees the foreign relations of Kazakhstan.

History 
The history of Kazakh diplomacy dates back to the period of the Kazakh Khanate where the Khans initiated the development of diplomatic relations and implemented the foreign policy. The Khanate's main purpose in terms of diplomacy was to negotiate the expansion of territories, with the desire to create trade routes, the travel roads, and trade centres for international exchange. The headquarters of the Kazakh khans had offices, which issued documents of a diplomatic and socio-economic nature. Kazakh khans appointed their envoys (known as ilchi), who were instructed to transmit messages and orders to neighboring rulers and governors. The first modern Kazakh foreign ministry was formed in the early 1920s as the diplomatic office for the Turkestan Autonomous Soviet Socialist Republic. This person who headed the Ministry was known as the People's Commissar for Foreign Affairs of the Turkestan ASSR, whose activities were regulated by the Commissariat of Foreign Affairs of the Turkestan ASSR. The position of a Minister of Foreign Affairs appeared in February 1944 after the adoption of the Soviet Law "On Submission of Powers to the Union Republics in the Field of Foreign Relations and on the Transformation of the People's Commissariat of Foreign Affairs from the All-Union into Union-Republic People’s Commissariat". This gave the Union republics the right to enter in direct relations with foreign states, however, the Ministry of Foreign Affairs of the USSR performed all the main foreign policy functions. Kazakhstan's foreign ministry in its current form was founded in 1991 after the Kazakh SSR became the Republic of Kazakhstan and gained its independence from the Soviet Union.

List of Ministers

References

External links 

  Ministry of Foreign Affairs

Foreign Affairs
Foreign relations of Kazakhstan
Kazakhstan